Anthony Ekezia Ilonu (November 13, 1937 – June 17, 2012) was the Roman Catholic bishop of the Roman Catholic Diocese of Okigwe, Nigeria.

Ordained in 1964, Ilonu was named bishop in 1981 and resigned in 2006.

Notes

20th-century Roman Catholic bishops in Nigeria
1937 births
2012 deaths
21st-century Roman Catholic bishops in Nigeria
Roman Catholic bishops of Okigwe